Stewart Beards (born 15 August 1967) is a retired English professional footballer.

Beards played four seasons in the Finnish Veikkausliiga for RoPS Rovaniemi and TPS Turku and one season in the Icelandic Úrvalsdeild for Valur.

References 

1967 births
Sportspeople from Lichfield
English footballers
Veikkausliiga players
Úrvalsdeild karla (football) players
Rovaniemen Palloseura players
Turun Palloseura footballers
Valur (men's football) players
English expatriate footballers
Expatriate footballers in Finland
Expatriate footballers in Iceland
Living people
Association football forwards